Harry Ainsley Jones (born 26 August 1989) is a rugby union fly-half who plays for Greater Sydney Rams and  Canada.
Jones made his debut for Canada in 2012 and was part of the Canada squad at the 2015 Rugby World Cup.

Career
In June 2021, Jones was named to Canada's 2020 Summer Olympics sevens team.

References

External links
 
 
 
 
 

1989 births
Living people
Canadian rugby union players
Canada international rugby union players
Sportspeople from Vancouver
University of British Columbia alumni
Pan American Games medalists in rugby sevens
Pan American Games gold medalists for Canada
Rugby sevens players at the 2014 Commonwealth Games
Commonwealth Games rugby sevens players of Canada
Canada international rugby sevens players
Rugby sevens players at the 2015 Pan American Games
Rugby sevens players at the 2019 Pan American Games
Medalists at the 2019 Pan American Games
Medalists at the 2015 Pan American Games
Rugby sevens players at the 2020 Summer Olympics
Olympic rugby sevens players of Canada